Newton Township is one of sixteen townships in Buchanan County, Iowa, USA. As of the 2000 census, its population was 423.

Geography
The unincorporated community of Monti is in the northern portion of the township. Other settlements in the township from the late 19th and early 20th centuries are abandoned. According to the USGS, Newton Township contains three cemeteries: Circle Grove, Saint Patrick's and Upper Spring Grove. Circle Grove Cemetery, established 1858, is maintained by the Circle Grove Cemetery Association. Upper Spring Grove Cemetery, established 1855, is classified as a Pioneer Cemetery with maintenance under the direction of the Newton Township trustees.

History
The first permanent white settler in Newton Township was a Joseph Austin, who built a cabin "by a spring at the edge of some timber in the township" sometime before or during 1847. The first election was held in the southern part of the township in August 1854. Many early settlers of the area were from Ireland.

Three cemeteries were established in the 1850s. In 1858, a Protestant congregation formed and met in a schoolhouse, then in 1884 erected a church building adjacent to the Circle Grove Cemetery in section 19, known as Hoover Church. A Catholic church and rectory were constructed adjoining the northern cemetery in 1870. Newtonville was established in 1873, when a post office was built near the center of the township, at 42.347°N 91.675°W (Sections 16 and 17, see map on right). In 1875, the State Atlas of Iowa showed two churches, seven schools, and 19 houses in the township. Just 11 years later, in 1886, Warner and Foote's map of Newton Township showed 137 houses, ten schools, three churches, and two post offices in the township.

Many other small settlements sprang up, including Erin, Atlantic, and Monti. None of these communities were ever incorporated. Atlantic was located at 42.311°N 91.685°W (Sections 28 and 33), and Erin at 42.369°N 91.600°W (Section 1). Monti was founded in 1885, on Buffalo Creek in the northern part of the township, at the location of the Catholic church (Sections 2 and 3). With the introduction of Rural Free Delivery in 1902, both the Newtonville and Monti post offices closed. During that year, Newtonville's population was 27.

In 1911, the village of Kiene was founded 1.5 miles west of Monti at 42.384°N 91.661°W (Section 4), the result of a planned railway through the area. Kiene was named after Henry Kiene or Peter Kiene, presidents of the proposed rail line, who planned a rail route west from Dubuque toward Independence in 1903. The Chicago, Anamosa and Northern (CAN) Railway was built through Newton Township in 1912 and passed through both Kiene and Monti. Monti soon became a small but bustling community, with stores, a blacksmith shop, a bank, and a flag station. In 1902, Monti's population was 110, and in 1920, it was 100. 

The old Newtonville Congregational Church was moved to Kiene in June 1914, and a new church was built at Newtonville. Kiene was a village of 25 residents in 1914. In 1924, Kiene's population was 17; in 1940, it was just 8.

The post-World War I years saw a decline in the area's population. The CAN railroad was sold for scrap during World War II. The Newtonville, Erin, and Atlantic areas emptied. By 1955, the only structure remaining at Kiene was the church. The official 1956 school district map for Buchanan County shows only the locations of Kiene and Monti; by this time, the other villages were gone. The Kiene Women's Fellowship organization and other groups were meeting at the church into the 1960s. The Kiene Congregational Church closed in 1970, its congregation merged into the Church of Christ United in Winthrop.

The school at Monti closed in 1966, with the disbanding of the Monti Consolidated School District. The northern portions of the district went to East Buchanan Community School District, while the southern areas were ceded to North Linn Community School District.

Today the only settlement left in Newton Township is Monti; traces of the old railroad grade can still be seen at the northern edge of the hamlet. St. Patrick's Catholic Church at Monti ceased regular masses in 2005.

Parks and recreation
There are two wildlife areas in Newton Township. Canoeing, fishing, and hunting are permitted at the park. Frogville Access, established in 1978, is a  park between Quasqueton and Troy Mills. It lies in the southwestern corner of the township.

References

External links 

 
 Photograph of Kiene, Iowa, early 20th century, Iowa Digital Library.
 US-Counties.com
 City-Data.com Comprehensive Statistical Data and more about Newton Township

Townships in Buchanan County, Iowa
Townships in Iowa
1854 establishments in Iowa
Populated places established in 1854